Merna Summers (born March 22, 1933, in Mannville, Alberta) is a Canadian short story writer. She was awarded the Marian Engel Award in 1989.

Works
 The Skating Party (1974) 
 Calling Home (1982)
 North of the Battle (1988)

References

1933 births
Writers from Alberta
Living people
Canadian women short story writers
20th-century Canadian short story writers
20th-century Canadian women writers